Shai Diego Hope (born 10 November 1993) is a Barbadian cricketer, who plays as a wicketkeeper/batsman for the West Indies cricket team. He is also the current ODI captain of the Windies. In June 2018, he was named the Men's Cricketer of the Year, Test Cricketer of the Year and the ODI Cricketer of the Year at the annual Cricket West Indies' Awards. The following year, he was named the CWI ODI Player of the Year. He is generally regarded as one of the best ODI batsmen in the contemporary cricketing world. Hope has also twice been named, for both 2020 and 2022, in the ICC ODI Team of the Year.

Personal life
Hope has an elder brother, Kyle Hope, who's a fellow cricketer. He pursued secondary schooling at Queen's College in Saint James, Barbados.

Early and domestic career
Hope was further educated at Bedes Senior School in East Sussex, England under the guidance of former Sussex captain Alan Wells. Whilst at Bedes, Hope guided the 1st XI to the national 20/20 final where he scored a half century in a losing cause versus Millfield. During the 2012 season, Hope had a brief stint at local East Sussex side Chiddingly CC averaging 46 runs throughout the season with a top score of 61. He also considered remaining in the United Kingdom at that time, with the intention to qualify to play for the England cricket team.

Hope has been described by the West Indian cricket writer and commentator Tony Cozier as "A stylish No. 3 batsman whose 211 for Barbados against Windward Isles was the tournament's only double-hundred". In 2017, he was a key member of the Barbados team that won the Regional Super50, scoring centuries in both the semi-final and final, and was named man of the match in both games.

In November 2019, Hope was selected to play for the Rangpur Rangers in the 2019–20 Bangladesh Premier League. In July 2020, he was named in the Barbados Tridents squad for the 2020 Caribbean Premier League. On 15 October 2022 Hope was named as the new captain, replacing Jason Holder, of the Barbados Pride for the 2021-22 Regional Super50 tournament.

International career
Hope made his Test debut against England on 1 May 2015. In August 2016, he was added to the West Indies squad for their Test series against India.

Hope made his One Day International (ODI) debut in the second match of the tri-series, against Sri Lanka. His maiden ODI ton came on his second ODI, in the same tour against Zimbabwe, when he scored 101 during chasing the 257 runs. His score did not change the game, where the match ended in a tie, which is the 34th tied ODI match and the first tied ODI match between the two teams and he was adjudged man of the match for his performance.

On 25 August 2017, Hope scored his maiden Test ton in the second Test against England. He along with Kraigg Brathwaite put a 246-run partnership to lift the West Indies total to 427. Chasing 322 in the second innings, Hope scored his second hundred and guided West Indies to a 5-wicket win. In the second innings also, Brathwaite and Hope added 144 runs as well. The win was West Indies' first away victory over England since 2000 and Hope was awarded man of the match for his winning performances. Hope's two centuries in the match against England marked the first time this feat had been achieved at Headingley Cricket Ground in first-class cricket. His contribution in the 2017 tour of England was recognised in April 2018 when he was named one of the five Wisden Cricketers of the Year.

In December 2017, Hope was added to the West Indies' Twenty20 International (T20I) squad ahead of their series against New Zealand. He made his T20I debut for the West Indies against New Zealand on 29 December 2017.

In October 2018, Cricket West Indies (CWI) awarded Hope a contract across all formats of cricket for the 2018–19 season.

In May 2019, Hope played in his 50th ODI match, in the opening fixture of the 2019 Ireland Tri-Nation Series. In that match, Hope and John Campbell made 365 runs for the opening wicket. It was the highest opening partnership in ODIs, and it was also the first time that both openers for the West Indies had scored 150 runs each in an ODI match. In the next match of the tri-series, against Bangladesh, Hope became the fastest batsman for the West Indies, in terms of number of innings, to score 2,000 runs in ODIs, doing so in his 47th innings.

Hope was named in the West Indies' squad for the 2019 Cricket World Cup. The International Cricket Council (ICC) named Hope as the key player of the West Indies' squad prior to the tournament. On 17 June 2019, in the match against Bangladesh, Hope played in his 100th international match for the West Indies. Hope scored 96 runs facing 121 balls with 4 fours and a six against Bangladesh at Taunton, 17 June 2019.

On 22 December 2019, during the third match against India, Hope became the second-fastest batsman, in terms of innings, to score 3,000 runs in ODIs, doing so in his 67th innings.

He was later named in the 2019 ICC ODI team of the Year. In June 2020, Hope was named in the West Indies' Test squad, for their series against England. The Test series was originally scheduled to start in May 2020, but was moved back to July 2020 due to the COVID-19 pandemic. 

On 8 June 2022 Hope went on to score 127 against Pakistan in the first game of a three match ODI series played at the Multan Cricket Stadium. In so doing he became the 3rd fastest batsman of all time to compile 4000 runs in one day internationals and the 11th West Indian batsman to accomplish this feat.

Hope played his 100th ODI match on 24 July 2022, scoring 115 against India in the second match of their bilateral series. Hope shared a fourth wicket stand of 117 with Nicholas Pooran but did so in a losing cause. He was later bestowed with the honour of being named in the 2022 ICC ODI team of the Year.

List of international centuries
Hope has scored two centuries in Test matches and 13 in One Day Internationals. His highest Test score of 147 came against England at Leeds in August 2017. His highest ODI score of 170 came against Ireland at Dublin in May 2019.

Test centuries

One Day International centuries

References

External links
 

1993 births
Living people
West Indies Test cricketers
West Indies One Day International cricketers
West Indies Twenty20 International cricketers
Barbados cricketers
Barbados Royals cricketers
Wisden Cricketers of the Year
Cricketers at the 2019 Cricket World Cup
People from Saint Michael, Barbados